Yuan Xinyue (born 21 December 1996) is a Chinese volleyball player who plays as a Middle Blocker. She is a member of the China women's national volleyball team and plays for Bayi since 2014. At 2.03m, Yuan is the tallest player in the history of the Chinese Women's Volleyball Team. Her impressive height advantage allows her to have a formidable presence at the net, and she is widely considered one of the key players in the team alongside her teammates Zhu Ting and Zhang Changning.

Career
Yuan Xinyue started her career as a professional volleyball player in the Bayi team, which represents the People's Liberation Army in national competitions. Her outstanding performance at the 2013 U18 World Championships, in which she was recognised as the Most Valuable Player, caught the eye of Chinese Women's Volleyball Team's head coach, Lang Ping. That year, she was selected to join the senior team's training camp, and officially joined the senior squad in 2014.

Yuan was part of the Chinese national team at the 2014 FIVB Volleyball Women's World Championship in Italy, where she won the silver medal after China lost to the USA in the finals. 
In recognition of her impressive performance at the World Championship, she was awarded the Best Newcomer award at the 2014 CCTV Sports Personality Awards.  In the following year, she participated in the 2015 FIVB Volleyball World Grand Prix,
as well as the 2015 FIVB World Cup, where she helped the team win its first gold at a major world tournament after more than a decade.

In 2016, she represented China in the Rio Olympic Games. The team went on to win its 3rd gold medal, after victories in 1984 and 2004.

In 2017, she represented China in the FIVB Volleyball World Grand Prix and the FIVB World Grand Champions Cup, and helped the team win gold in the latter. She was awarded the Best Middle Blocker award in the World Grand Champions Cup.

In 2018, Yuan took part in the inaugural Volleyball Nations League, in which the team won bronze. In August, Yuan took part in the 2018 Asian Games held in Jakarta, Indonesia. The team dominated the competition with eight 3-0 victories and won the championship title without dropping a single set. In October, Yuan represented China in the FIVB Volleyball Women's World Championships held in Japan. The team won bronze after being defeated by Italy in the semi-finals, in a gruelling five-set match.

In 2019, Yuan took part in the 2nd Volleyball Nations League. During the group stage held in Hong Kong, China faced the same Italy squad which defeated them in the 2018 World Championships. After losing 0-2, China went on to win three consecutive sets, eventually securing a surprising 3-2 victory against Italy. Yuan played a crucial role in this victory. In particular, her block at set point in the third set helped China stay in the game.

In September 2019, Yuan again represented China in the FIVB Women's World Cup, in which China secured yet another world title after eleven straight wins. Throughout the tournament, China only lost three sets against their opponents. Yuan was a key figure in this overwhelming victory.

Clubs
  Guangdong Evergrande (2013–14)
  Bayi (2014–)
  Jiangsu (2018) (loaned)
  Bayi (2018–)

Awards

National team

Junior Team
 2012 Asian Youth Girls Volleyball Championship -  Silver Medal
 2013 U18 World Championship -  Gold Medal

Senior Team
 2014 World Championship -  Silver Medal
 2015 Asian Championship -  Gold Medal
 2015 World Cup -  Gold Medal
 2016 Olympic Games -  Gold Medal
 2017 World Grand Champions Cup -  Gold Medal
 2018 Volleyball Nations League -  Bronze Medal
 2018 Asian Games -  Gold Medal
 2018 World Championship -  Bronze Medal
2019 World Cup -  Gold Medal

Clubs
 2014–2015 Chinese Volleyball League -  Gold medal, with Bayi
 2017–2018 Chinese Volleyball League -  Bronze medal, with Jiangsu

Individuals
 2012 Asian Youth Girls Volleyball Championship "Best Blocker"
 2013 FIVB U18 World Championship "Most Valuable Player"
 2013 FIVB U18 World Championship "Best Middle Blocker"
 2017 World Grand Champions Cup "Best Middle Blocker"
 2017–18 Chinese Volleyball League "Best Middle Blocker"

References

External links

1996 births
Living people
Volleyball players from Chongqing
Place of birth missing (living people)
Chinese women's volleyball players
Olympic gold medalists for China in volleyball
Volleyball players at the 2016 Summer Olympics
2016 Olympic gold medalists for China
Middle blockers
Asian Games gold medalists for China
Asian Games medalists in volleyball
Medalists at the 2018 Asian Games
Volleyball players at the 2018 Asian Games
Volleyball players at the 2020 Summer Olympics
21st-century Chinese women